That Sound may refer to:

 "That Sound" (Pump Friction song), 1997
 "That Sound" (Sam Fender song), 2018